HMS Sarawak (K591) was a  of the United Kingdom that served during World War II. She originally was ordered by the United States Navy as the Tacoma-class patrol frigate USS Patton (PF-87) and was transferred to the Royal Navy prior to completion.

Construction and acquisition
The ship, originally designated a "patrol gunboat," PG-195, was ordered by the United States Maritime Commission under a United States Navy contract as USS Patton. She was reclassified as a "patrol frigate," PF-87, on 15 April 1943 and laid down by the Walsh-Kaiser Company at Providence, Rhode Island, on 29 September 1943. Intended for transfer to the United Kingdom, the ship was renamed Sarawak by the British  and was launched on 25 October 1943. She was completed on 7 February 1944.

Service history
Transferred to the United Kingdom under Lend-Lease on 7 February 1944, the ship served in the Royal Navy as HMS Sarawak (K591) until decommissioned in 1945.

Disposal
The United Kingdom returned Sarawak to the U.S. Navy on 31 May 1946. She was scrapped in 1947.

References

Notes

Citations

Bibliography

External links

 Navsource Online: Frigate Photo Archive HMS Sarawak (K 591) ex-Patton ex-PF-87 ex-PG-195

1943 ships
Ships built in Providence, Rhode Island
Tacoma-class frigates
Colony-class frigates
World War II frigates and destroyer escorts of the United States
World War II frigates of the United Kingdom
Royal Navy ship names